Martovce (Hungarian pronunciation:) is a village and municipality in the Komárno District in the Nitra Region of south-west Slovakia.

Geography
The village lies at an altitude of 112 metres and covers an area of 19.964 km².
It has a population of about 760 people.

History
In the 9th century, the territory of Martovce became part of the Kingdom of Hungary. 
In historical records the village was first mentioned in 1438.
After the Austro-Hungarian army disintegrated in November 1918, Czechoslovak troops occupied the area, later acknowledged internationally by the Treaty of Trianon. Between 1938 and 1945 Martovce once more  became part of Miklós Horthy's Hungary through the First Vienna Award. From 1945 until the Velvet Divorce, it was part of Czechoslovakia. Since then it has been part of Slovakia.

Ethnic communities 
The village is about 91% Hungarian, 9% Slovak.

Facilities
The village has a public library, and a  football pitch.

Villages and municipalities in the Komárno District
Hungarian communities in Slovakia